The 1893–94 Rugby Union County Championship was the sixth edition of England's premier rugby union club competition at the time.

Yorkshire won the competition for the fifth time, defeating all three teams in the Championship Series.

Draw and Results

Group Winners

Championship Series

Championship series matches

See also
 English rugby union system
 Rugby union in England

References

Rugby Union County Championship
County Championship (rugby union) seasons